Employment Service Convention, 1948 is  an International Labour Organization Convention.

It was established in 1948, with the preamble stating:
Having decided upon the adoption of certain proposals concerning the organisation of the employment service,...

Ratifications
As of December 2022, the convention has been ratified by 92 states. Of the ratifying states, three states have denounced the treaty.

External links 
Text.
Ratifications.

International Labour Organization conventions
Treaties entered into force in 1950
Treaties concluded in 1948
Treaties of Albania
Treaties of Algeria
Treaties of the People's Republic of Angola
Treaties of Argentina
Treaties of Australia
Treaties of Austria
Treaties of Azerbaijan
Treaties of the Bahamas
Treaties of Belarus
Treaties of Belgium
Treaties of Belize
Treaties of Bolivia
Treaties of Bosnia and Herzegovina
Treaties of the Second Brazilian Republic
Treaties of Canada
Treaties of the Central African Republic
Treaties of Colombia
Treaties of Costa Rica
Treaties of Cuba
Treaties of Cyprus
Treaties of Czechoslovakia
Treaties of the Czech Republic
Treaties of the Democratic Republic of the Congo (1964–1971)
Treaties of Denmark
Treaties of Djibouti
Treaties of the Dominican Republic
Treaties of the Kingdom of Egypt
Treaties of El Salvador
Treaties of the Ethiopian Empire
Treaties of Finland
Treaties of the French Fourth Republic
Treaties of Georgia (country)
Treaties of Ghana
Treaties of Greece
Treaties of Guatemala
Treaties of Guinea-Bissau
Treaties of Hungary
Treaties of India
Treaties of Indonesia
Treaties of the Kingdom of Iraq
Treaties of Ireland
Treaties of Israel
Treaties of Japan
Treaties of Kazakhstan
Treaties of Kenya
Treaties of South Korea
Treaties of Lebanon
Treaties of the Kingdom of Libya
Treaties of Lithuania
Treaties of Luxembourg
Treaties of Madagascar
Treaties of Malaysia
Treaties of Mali
Treaties of Malta
Treaties of Mauritius
Treaties of Moldova
Treaties of Mongolia
Treaties of Montenegro
Treaties of the People's Republic of Mozambique
Treaties of New Zealand
Treaties of the Netherlands
Treaties of Nigeria
Treaties of Nicaragua
Treaties of Norway
Treaties of Panama
Treaties of Peru
Treaties of the Philippines
Treaties of the Estado Novo (Portugal)
Treaties of the Socialist Republic of Romania
Treaties of San Marino
Treaties of São Tomé and Príncipe
Treaties of Serbia and Montenegro
Treaties of Yugoslavia
Treaties of Sierra Leone
Treaties of Singapore
Treaties of Slovakia
Treaties of Slovenia
Treaties of Francoist Spain
Treaties of Suriname
Treaties of Sweden
Treaties of Switzerland
Treaties of the United Arab Republic
Treaties of Tanganyika
Treaties of Thailand
Treaties of North Macedonia
Treaties of Tunisia
Treaties of Turkey
Treaties of Venezuela
Treaties of Ecuador
Treaties of West Germany
Treaties extended to Curaçao and Dependencies
Treaties extended to the Territory of Papua and New Guinea
Treaties extended to the Colony of the Bahamas
Treaties extended to British Honduras
Treaties extended to British Cyprus
Treaties extended to Gibraltar
Treaties extended to Guernsey
Treaties extended to British Guiana
Treaties extended to Jersey
Treaties extended to British Kenya
Treaties extended to the Crown Colony of Malta
Treaties extended to the Isle of Man
Treaties extended to British Mauritius
Treaties extended to the Colony and Protectorate of Nigeria
Treaties extended to the Colony of Sierra Leone
Treaties extended to the Crown Colony of Singapore
Treaties extended to Swaziland (protectorate)
Treaties extended to Tanganyika (territory)
Treaties extended to the Uganda Protectorate
1948 in labor relations